Infante João, Duke of Beja (16 March 1842 – 27 December 1861) was a Portuguese infante (prince) and member of the House of Braganza.

Early life 
Infante João was born in Lisbon the third son of Queen Maria II of Portugal and King Fernando II. He was created Duke of Beja and held the additional title of Prince of Saxe-Coburg and Gotha, Duke in Saxony as a dynast of the House of Saxe-Coburg and Gotha.

Military 
João received a military education and was a colonel of a cavalry regiment. He was visiting England and France with his brother the Duke of Porto, heir presumptive to the throne, when they were summoned to return to Portugal by their brother King Pedro V who was dying of typhoid fever or cholera. Their brother died on 11 November 1861 before they could return along with their fifteen-year-old brother Fernando. With his death the Duke of Porto became King Luís I and João became heir presumptive to the throne.

He did not remain heir for long as he died a month later of the same illness that killed his brothers in Lisbon on 27 December 1861 aged 19 and unmarried.

Ancestry

References

1842 births
1861 deaths
House of Braganza-Saxe-Coburg and Gotha
Portuguese infantes
108
People from Lisbon
19th-century Portuguese people
Burials at the Monastery of São Vicente de Fora
Constables of Portugal
Deaths from typhoid fever
Deaths from cholera
3
3
3
Knights Grand Cross of the Order of the Immaculate Conception of Vila Viçosa
Sons of kings

Non-inheriting heirs presumptive